Msipa is a surname. Notable people with the surname include:

Cephas Msipa (1931–2016), Zimbabwean politician
Emmaculate Msipa (born 1992), Zimbabwean association football player

Surnames of African origin